Tei may refer to:

 Sandister Tei, Ghanaian journalist and Wikimedian
 Tei (singer) (born 1983), Korean pop singer
 Tei, Bucharest, a neighborhood in Bucharest, Romania
 Tellurium monoiodide, a chemical compound with the formula TeI
 Towa Tei, an artist, record producer and DJ (b. 1965)

TEI may refer to:

 Tarlac Electric
 Text Encoding Initiative, a consortium that develops standards for digital texts
 Technological Educational Institute, a type of tertiary education institute in Greece
 Terminal Endpoint Identifier (TEI), together with Service Access Point Identifier (SAPI) the unique identification of terminal equipment in the ISDN DSS1 standard
 Tertiary Education Institution in New Zealand 
 Tezu Airport in India (IATA code)
 Total Economic Impact, a financial metric (see Application Portfolio Management)
 Trans Earth Injection, the procedure that a spacecraft performs to get back into the Earth's gravitational influence
 Triethylindium, a chemical compound
 Tusaş Engine Industries, a Turkish aircraft engine manufacturer